Benjamin Louis Handlogten (born November 16, 1973) is an American former professional basketball player who played in the National Basketball Association (NBA) and other leagues.

Early life and education
Handlogten, who was born in Grand Rapids, Michigan graduated from South Christian High School of Grand Rapids and attended Western Michigan University in Kalamazoo, Michigan.

Professional career
Handlogten grew up as a Detroit Pistons fan during the "Bad Boys" era of the team.  Not selected in the 1996 NBA Draft, Handlogten signed with the Pistons as a free agent on September 18, 1996 but was cut before the regular season.  entered professional basketball in 1996 with the Grand Rapids Hoops of the Continental Basketball Association. For the 1997–98 season, Handlogten played for Oyak Renault of the Turkish Basketball League (TBL) and averaged 17.6 points, 10.4 rebounds, and 1.4 blocks. In 1998, Handlogten signed with Daiwa of the Japanese bj league and had an average 16.6 points, 11.8 rebounds, and 1.5 blocks.

After his one season with Daiwa, Handlogten played two more seasons in the TBL: with Galatasaray in 1999–2000 and Ülkerspor in 2000–01. Handlogten averaged 17.4 points and 8.4 rebounds in the 2001–02 season with Virtus Roma of the Italian Lega Basket Serie A. In the 2002–03 season, Handlogten played for Makedonikos B.C. of the Greek Basket League and was the league's top rebounder that season with 12.8 per game. With Makedonikos, Handlogten scored an average 16.8 points per game and also had 1.4 assists and 1.1 blocks per game.

He signed as an undrafted free agent with the Utah Jazz of the National Basketball Association (NBA) on September 30, 2003. Handlogten played 17 games and averaged 4.0 points, 3.2 rebounds, and 0.4 assists before a season-ending ACL injury on December 26, 2003. Handlogten scored a career-high 13 points on December 12  and made a season-high 9 rebounds two days later, December 14.

On February 19, 2004, the Jazz traded Handlogten and Keon Clark to the Phoenix Suns for Tom Gugliotta and future draft picks; the Suns waived Handlogten the following day. Following two ten-day contracts, Handlogten signed a contract for the rest of the season with the Utah Jazz on March 29, 2005. He averaged 4.5 points, 3.1 rebounds, and 0.6 assists in 21 games (5 starts). On April 1, Handlogten scored a season-high 12 points and made a season- and career-high 11 rebounds.

The New Jersey Nets waived Handlogten on November 8, 2005, after Handlogten signed on October 4. Handlogten then signed with  Ulsan Mobis Phoebus of the Korean Basketball League the following week. On February 19, 2006, he agreed to join Winterthur FC Barcelona of Liga ACB for the rest of the season. However, the team delayed the signing pending medical examinations. In March 2006, he was cut by the team.

Post-playing career
After his basketball career, Handlogten became owner of a real estate/construction company in Charlotte, North Carolina. Joining the school as an assistant coach in 2008,  Handlogten became head boys' basketball coach at SouthLake Christian Academy of Huntersville, North Carolina.  In 2011, Handlogten became an executive at a medical supply company.

References

External links
Player Profile @ NBA.com
Player Profile @ basketball-reference.com

1973 births
Living people
American expatriate basketball people in Greece
American expatriate basketball people in Italy
American expatriate basketball people in Japan
American expatriate basketball people in South Korea
American expatriate basketball people in Spain
American expatriate basketball people in Turkey
American men's basketball players
Basketball players from Grand Rapids, Michigan
Centers (basketball)
Galatasaray S.K. (men's basketball) players
Grand Rapids Hoops players
Greek Basket League players
High school basketball coaches in the United States
Makedonikos B.C. players
New Jersey Nets players
Niigata Albirex BB players
Oyak Renault basketball players
Pallacanestro Virtus Roma players
Ülker G.S.K. basketball players
Ulsan Hyundai Mobis Phoebus players
Undrafted National Basketball Association players
Utah Jazz players
Western Michigan Broncos men's basketball players